The 1932 San Francisco State Golden Gaters football team represented San Francisco State Teachers College—now known as San Francisco State University—as an independent during the 1932 college football season. Led by second-year head coach Dave Cox, San Francisco State compiled a record of 1–7 and was outscored by its opponents 149 to 157. The team played home games at Ewing Field in San Francisco. Although the "Gator" was voted to be the mascot for the team in 1931, local newspaper articles called the team the "Golden Gaters".

Schedule

References

San Francisco State
San Francisco State Gators football seasons
San Francisco State Golden Gaters football